Sing Sing is a prison in New York State.

Sing Sing may also refer to:

Music
 Sing-Sing (band), a British band
 Sing Sing (1984–1994), a 1997 album by The Honeymoon Killers
 "Sing Sing" (song), a 1978 song by Gaz
 "Sing Sing", a song from the Marianas Trench album Masterpiece Theatre

Other uses
 Sing Sing (film), a 1983 Italian comedy film
 Sing Sing (horse) (1957-72), a British thoroughbred racehorse
 Sing-sing (New Guinea), a cultural event in Papua New Guinea
 Sing Sing, historic name of the village of Ossining, New York

See also
 Sing (disambiguation)
 Sing Sing Sing (disambiguation)